Lee Tae-hee (born 16 June 1992) is a South Korean footballer who plays as defender for Daegu FC.

Career
Lee joined Seongnam FC in January 2016. He made his professional debut in the Champions League game against Bình Dương on 15 March.

References

External links

1992 births
Living people
Association football defenders
South Korean footballers
Seongnam FC players
Daegu FC players
Gimcheon Sangmu FC players
K League 1 players
K League 2 players
Soongsil University alumni